David Lale may refer to:

 David Lale (Australian cellist) (born 1962)
 David Lale (British cellist) (born 1981)